Kontakt may refer to:

 Kontakt (film), a 2005 Macedonian film directed by Sergej Stanojkovski
 Kontakt (magazine), a Norwegian political magazine (1947–1954)
 Kontakt (software), a music sampler
 Kontakt-series explosive reactive armour; see Kontakt-5

See also

 Contact (disambiguation)
 
 
 Kontakte (1958–60), electronic music by Karlheinz Stockhausen
 Contakt
 Kontact